"Love Guaranteed" is a song by British R&B group Damage, released on 1 March 1997 as the fourth single from the band's debut album, Forever. The song peaked at No. 7 on the UK Singles Chart, becoming the band's joint third most successful single to date. The song was also the band's second single to have been produced by Cutfather & Joe, which was remixed for its release as a single. The music video features the band performing the song wearing suits, against a backdrop which could possibly represent a wedding reception or party. Actor Sir Christopher Lee stars in the music video guiding the band through different settings in time.

Track listing
CD1
 "Love Guaranteed" (Cutfather & Joe Radio Edit) - 3:36
 "Troubled Times" (Richards/Bromfield/Linslee Campbell/Michelle Escoffery, produced by Linslee)
 "Love Guaranteed" (Silk House Guarantee 12") - 8:35

CD2
 "Love Guaranteed" (M-Doc Mix) - 4:10
 "Prove Your Love"
 "Love Guaranteed" (Dodge Mix) - 4:39

Cassette
 "Love Guaranteed" (Cutfather & Joe Radio Edit) - 3:36
 "Troubled Times"

12" vinyl
 "Love Guaranteed" (Silk House Guarantee 12") - 8:35
 "Love Guaranteed" (Silk's Guarantee Dub) 
 "Love Guaranteed" (Cutfather & Joe Radio Edit) - 3:36

German 12"
 "Love Guaranteed" (Elusive Club Mix) - 6:05  
 "Love Guaranteed" (Dubeluded Club) - 6:15  
 "Love Guaranteed" (Elusive Club Mix TV Track) - 6:05  
 "Love Guaranteed" (D.Y.M.K. Dub) - 6:15  
 "Love Guaranteed" (Elusive Club Mix Instrumental) - 6:05

External links
[ Allmusic biography]

References

1997 songs
1997 singles
Damage (British band) songs
Songs written by Jimmy Jam and Terry Lewis
Song recordings produced by Cutfather & Joe
Big Life Records singles